Tolworth railway station, in the Royal Borough of Kingston upon Thames in south London, is a station on the Chessington Branch Line,  down the line from . The station is part of the London suburban network of South Western Railway and is in Travelcard Zone 5.

The station, like all others on the branch, is built in the art deco style of the 1930s using concrete arcs for canopies; it was opened, as the original terminus of the branch, on 29 May 1938.
Station buildings are below at street level on the Kingston Road. The original goods depot is now partly a freight depot operated by DB Cargo UK. The remaining area of the site is operated by London United as a bus depot.

Services 
South Western Railway operate all the services on the Chessington Branch Line and all trains that stop at Tolworth station. In the inbound direction, trains service the station every thirty minutes during both peak and off-peak hours. Local trains run at all times to London Waterloo, calling at all stations for exception of Queenstown Road. These trains take 33 minutes to arrive at London Waterloo.

In the outbound direction all services call locally, taking four minutes to arrive at Chessington South.

Connections
London Buses routes 406, 418, and  K2 serve the station directly. Routes 281 and K1 are accessible with a short walk, though given they both service the busy main line Surbiton railway station, interchange is less popular by virtue of the greater frequency of service from Surbiton to London Waterloo.

References 

Railway stations in the Royal Borough of Kingston upon Thames
Former Southern Railway (UK) stations
Railway stations in Great Britain opened in 1938
Railway stations served by South Western Railway